Bhakta Prahlada is a 1967 Indian Telugu-language Hindu mythological film directed by Chitrapu Narayana Rao based on a script by D. V. Narasa Raju. It stars S. V. Ranga Rao and Anjali Devi. Roja Ramani, in her film debut, plays the title character. Bhakta Prahlada is produced on the AVM Productions banner by A. V. Meiyappan and his sons, M. Murugan, M. Kumaran and M. Saravanan. The film is based on the legend of Prahlada, a character in Bhagavata Purana known for his devotion to the Hindu god Vishnu.

Bhakta Prahlada is the third Telugu film based on Prahlada, after the 1932 and 1942 films of the same name. Unlike the earlier two, which were filmed in black-and-white, this version was shot in Eastman Color Negative film. Its script was completed by May 1965. Since Bhakta Prahlada and Ave Kallu were simultaneously produced by AVM Productions, principal photography and post-production were delayed and lasted for one-and-a-half years.

Bhakta Prahlada, released on 12 January 1967, was a commercial success and completed a hundred-day run in theatres. It received the Nandi Award for Third Best Feature Film. The film was dubbed into Tamil with the same title and into Hindi (as Bhakt Prahlad) that year, with small changes in the cast.

Plot 
The Four Kumaras visit Vaikuntha, the abode of Vishnu. Jaya-Vijaya, the demigod gatekeepers of Vaikuntha, fail to recognise them and deny them entry. The Kumaras curse the pair, saying that they would have to give up divinity, be born and live as mortal beings on Earth. Vishnu fails to remove the curse, and offers two solutions: be Vishnu's devotees in seven human lives, or his enemies in three demonic lives. Jaya-Vijaya cannot bear separation from Vishnu for so long, and choose the latter.

In their first demonic lives, Jaya-Vijaya are born as Hiranyakashipu and Hiranyaksha to the sage Kashyapa and Earth goddess Diti at sunset during an inauspicious time. Hiranyaksha, in an attempt to win over the deities, torments the Earth and its inhabitants. Bhudevi, the Earth goddess, goes to Vaikuntha and seeks Vishnu's help. Vishnu arrives as Varaha, a wild boar-faced avatar, kills Hiranyaksha and saves the Earth. Seeking revenge for his brother's death, Hiranyakashipu prays to Brahma for immortality. He becomes immune to being killed by various factors, including by man or beast.

Indra, king of the deities, tries to kill Hiranyakashipu's wife Leelavathi and her unborn child. The sage Narada intervenes and brings Leelavathi to his hermitage, where she gives birth to a boy named Prahlada. Hiranyakashipu invades Vaikuntha, but cannot find Vishnu. Proclaiming himself king of all the celestial worlds, he returns to Earth. The deities approach Vishnu, who promises to kill Hiranyakashipu at the appropriate time.

Five years later, Prahlada is sent to the hermitage of Chanda-Amarka (the children of Hiranyakashipu's master) for his education. After returning from the hermitage, Hiranyakashipu learns that Prahlada has become a staunch devotee of Vishnu and calls the deity Srihari. Hiranyakashipu explains to Prahlada that Srihari was responsible for Hiranyaksha's death (and is their enemy), and asks him to stop worshipping Srihari. Prahlada politely declines.

Hiranyakashipu then makes several attempts to kill his son, hoping that the fear of death would make Prahlada stop praying to Srihari. Prahlada is starved, and imprisoned in a dark room. When he refuses to relent, Hiranyakashipu orders his soldiers to force elephants to trample Prahlada; when that fails, they throw the boy off a steep cliff. Srihari rescues Prahlada; the soldiers then summon a group of snake charmers and ask them to harm Prahlada with snakes. The boy prays to Srihari, and the snakes become garlands of roses. Shocked, the snake charmers beg Prahlada to bring the snakes back; he prays to Srihari, who restores the snakes. The snake charmers declare Prahlada their leader, further angering Hiranyakashipu.

He then orders his soldiers to tie Prahlada's hands and feet and throw him into the sea. Convinced that the boy is dead, Hiranyakashipu laments killing his son to avenge his brother's death and the fact that the child had more love for Srihari than for him. Prahlada is rescued by Srihari, who sends him back home. Initially happy to see the boy alive, Hiranyakashipu is angry that his son still worships Srihari. Narada confirms to Hiranyakashipu that Srihari is saving Prahlada, adding that he resides in the boy, whose death would defeat him.

In a final attempt, Hiranyakashipu orders Prahlada to drink poisoned milk in front of him. The boy drinks it and survives, making Hiranyakashipu believe that his death has arrived in the form of his son. When Hiranyakashipu asks Prahlada about Srihari's abode, the boy replies that he is omnipresent. Hiranyakashipu then breaks a pillar with his mace, summoning Srihari out of it. Srihari arrives as Narasimha (another avatar of Vishnu with a man's torso and a lion's face), and kills Hiranyakashipu. Narasimha's anger is cooled by Prahlada and the deities, who praise him in song and ask him to re-appear as Srihari. Vishnu appears, crowns Prahlada as king of the demons, and advises him to lead a virtuous life as a ruler.

Cast 

Male cast
S. V. Ranga Rao as Hiranyakashipu
M. Balamuralikrishna as Narada
Relangi as Chanda
Padmanabham as Amarka
Haranath as Vishnu
Dhulipala Seetarama Sastry as Indra
Ramana Reddy as a snake charmer
V. Sivaram as Kashyapa
V. Nagayya as Shukracharya (cameo appearance)
Vijayakumar as one of the Four Kumaras
 T. S. Balaiah and A. Karunanidhi as Prahlad's mentors (Tamil version)
 Rajendra Nath and Dhumal (Hindi version)

Female cast
Anjali Devi as Leelavathi
Jayanthi as Diti
T. Kanakam as a snake charmer
Baby Roja Ramani as Prahlada
L. Vijayalakshmi as a dancer in Hiranyakashipu's court
Gitanjali as Menaka
Vijaya Lalitha as Urvashi
Vennira Aadai Nirmala as Tilottama
Shanta as Rambha

Production

Development 
A fan of stories based on children, AVM Productions founder A. V. Meiyappan wanted to produce a film based on the legend of Prahlada (a character in Bhagavata Purana known for his devotion to the Hindu god Vishnu) with his sons M. Kumaran, M. Saravanan and M. Murugan. Encouraged by the success of Naadi Aada Janme (1965), the Telugu remake of his Tamil production Naanum Oru Penn (1963), Meiyappan decided to produce Bhaktha Prahlada in Telugu. According to Kumaran, Meiyappan believed that mythological films were more appreciated by the Telugu audience than they were by the Tamil diaspora.

D. V. Narasa Raju wrote the film's story and screenplay, since Meiyappan wanted a more contemporary and dramatic approach. Unlike the 1932 and 1942 Telugu films of the same name which were filmed in black-and-white, Meiyappan wanted this version to be filmed in colour. Chitrapu Narayana Rao, who directed the 1942 film, approached Meiyappan in May 1965 and asked to direct a film. Meiyappan signed him as director for Bhaktha Prahlada, since Narayana Rao was in financial straits due to the failure of his Krishna Kuchela (1961). S. Rajeswara Rao composed the film's soundtrack and background score. A. Vincent handled the cinematography, R. Vittal edited the film and A. K. Sekhar was its art director.

Casting 
S. V. Ranga Rao and Anjali Devi were cast as the demon king Hiranyakashipu and his wife, Leelavathi (Kayadhu in Bhagavata Purana). The producers held an audition for the role of Prahlada, inviting many children in and around Madras (now Chennai) to AVM Studios. Roja Ramani was cast as Prahlada after a screen test and a song rehearsal in which she held a live snake. She was recommended to Meiyappan by her father Satyam's employer, an editor of the now-defunct magazine Cinema Rangam in Madras. Since Ramani was pale and thin, the producers approached a nutritionist to help her meet the role's requirements.

Singer M. Balamuralikrishna was cast as the sage Narada, making his acting debut in film. When his choice was criticised (because of Balamuralikrishna's height), Meiyappan retorted that the casting was apt since the role would be used for comic effect. Haranath played the role of Vishnu. Relangi and Padmanabham were cast as Prahlada's teachers, Chanda and Amarka. Ramana Reddy and T. Kanakam were signed as snake charmers for a key scene. L. Vijayalakshmi played the royal dancer in Hiranyakashipu's court; Shanta, Vijaya Lalitha, Gitanjali, and Vennira Aadai Nirmala were cast as the apsaras (celestial dancers) Rambha, Urvashi, Menaka and Tilottama, respectively.

Filming 
Bhaktha Prahlada was shot in Eastman Color Negative film, and was AVM's second colour film, after Anbe Vaa (1966). Although the script was completed by May 1965, the principal photography and post-production phases lasted for one-and-a-half years. Meiyappan produced another Telugu film, Ave Kallu (a remake of his 1967 Tamil production Athey Kangal), simultaneously with Bhaktha Prahlada. His sons were more interested in Ave Kallu than Bhaktha Prahlada, uncertain of the latter's commercial viability. When Sekhar showed the set designs to Meiyappan and his sons before building them, they rejected them in favour of Ave Kallu. Filming was delayed, and the cast and crew became impatient and frustrated towards the end of production.

During filming, Ramani was trained by "Rangoon" Ramarao (who played Amarka in the 1942 film) in dialogue diction. In the scene where the snake charmers place a snake on Prahlada's shoulders, a trained wheat-coloured snake was used during rehearsals and a black cobra was chosen for the filming. For the scene where elephants are forced to trample Prahlada, a child stunt artiste from the Great Oriental Circus was initially engaged as Ramani's double. The child was dismissed when Ramani began crying, however, and she performed the scene herself. Balamuralikrishna remembered filming a scene as Narada: "I had to stand on a stool without proper balancing, and I go up (into the "sky") as someone raises it up on a jack. I precariously stand there with a fear that I'd fall off the stool but I should not show it in my face – I should instead sing with a smiling face!"

Narayana Rao was reluctant to direct the film's climactic scene, since he could not forget Hiranyakashipu's death scene in a stage play in where the actor playing Narasimha was emotionally involved. Murugan directed the scene according to Meiyappan's wishes, and a double was engaged for Ranga Rao for the climactic scene. Meiyappan, dissatisfied with the overall result, took close-up shots of Ranga Rao to make the scene look authentic. Gopalakrishnan and K. S. Reddy choreographed the film's dance scenes. According to cinematographer A. Vincent, to achieve the "pillar split effect" in the scene where Narasimha emerges from a pillar and kills Hiranyakashipu "we marked each frame increasing the markings step by step". Vincent described it as the "one-turn work", and the scene was shot with a Mitchell camera.

Soundtrack 
S. Rajeswara Rao composed the film's soundtrack and background score, assisted by Rajagopal and Krishnan. Bhaktha Prahlada soundtrack consisted of 23 songs, and poems from Andhra Maha Bhagavatham (the Telugu translation of Bhagavatha Purana by the 15th-century poet Pothana. Samudrala Sr., Samudrala Jr., Kosaraju Raghavaiah, Palagummi Padmaraju, Daasarathi Krishnamacharyulu and Aarudhra wrote the song lyrics. "Varamosage Vanamali" was composed using Bihag raga and sung by Balamuralikrishna. "Kanulaku Veluguvu Neeve" was based on the Mohana and Abheri ragas.

The soundtrack, released by HMV Records, was critically praised. "Jeevamu Neeve Kadha", "Raara Priya Sundara", "Janani Varadayini Trilochani" and "Sirisiri Laali Chinnari Laali" became popular after the film's release. Among the poems, the renditions of "Kaladambodhi" and "Indhugaladu Andhuledanu" were praised by critics.

The Tamil version of the soundtrack has lyrics by Thiruchi Thiyagarajan, Vaali, Ku. Ma. Balasubramaniam, V. Seetharaman and Alangudi Somu.

Release and reception 
Bhaktha Prahlada was released on 12 January 1967. The film was distributed in the Andhra Pradesh, Madras and Nizam regions by Navayuga Films. The first copy was screened for President Sarvepalli Radhakrishnan, who praised the performances of its cast (particularly Ramani's). A reviewer writing for Andhra Prabha on 22 January 1967, compared the film with the earlier two films of the same name and opined the 1967 film was a better made version. They stated that in addition to better technology, the stellar performances of Ranga Rao, Anjali and Ramani set it apart. Reviewing the Tamil version, Kalki praised it for the colour sequences, photography and Ramani's performance. Bhaktha Prahlada was a commercial success, completing a 100-day theatrical run. It received the Nandi Award for Third Best Feature Film in 1967.

Other versions 
The film was dubbed into Tamil with the same title and into Hindi as Bhakt Prahlad, with scenes related to Chanda-Amarka re-shot with different actors. A. Karunanidhi and T. S. Balaiah played Chanda-Amarka in the Tamil version, and were replaced by Rajendra Nath and Dumal in the Hindi version. The Tamil version had dialogues by Aaroor Dass, and was distributed by AVM themselves. The Tamil and Hindi versions were released on 24 March and 2 November 1967, respectively. The Kannada version, also entitled Bhakta Prahlada, was released by AVM on 26 March 1974.

Notes

References

Bibliography

External links 
 

1960s Telugu-language films
1967 films
AVM Productions films
Films about Hinduism
Films about Prahlada
Films based on the Bhagavata Purana
Films directed by Chitrapu Narayana Rao
Films scored by S. Rajeswara Rao
Hindu mythological films